TRNA (guanine26-N2)-dimethyltransferase (Trm1p, TRM1, tRNA (m22G26)dimethyltransferase) is an enzyme with systematic name S-adenosyl-L-methionine:tRNA (guanine26-N2)-dimethyltransferase. This enzyme catalyses the following chemical reaction

 2 S-adenosyl-L-methionine + guanine26 in tRNA  2 S-adenosyl-L-homocysteine + N2-dimethylguanine26 in tRNA

The enzyme dissociates from its tRNA substrate between the two consecutive methylation reactions.

References

External links 
 

EC 2.1.1